Southwest F.O.B. ("Freight On Board") was a 1960s psychedelic rock group from Dallas, Texas, now perhaps best remembered because it featured Dan Seals and John Colley, who later found great success as the duo England Dan and John Ford Coley. The Southwest F.O.B. also included Michael (Doc) Woolbright on the bass.

Started by guitar player Larry "Ovid" Stevens when they were students at W. W. Samuell High School in Dallas, the band secured a minor hit in 1968 (reaching number 56) with a cover of the West Coast Pop Art Experimental Band song "Smell of Incense", nationally released on the Stax subsidiary label Hip Records. The band's sole LP was also called Smell of Incense; it has been reissued as a remastered, expanded CD by Sundazed Records, now out of print. Later success eluded them, and the band broke up in 1969. 

Dan Seals died on March 25, 2009. He and classmate John Colley, who later changed the spelling of his last name to Coley, formed a group with three other Samuell students called the Playboys Five. That became Theze Few, which morphed into Dallas high school band Southwest F.O.B. 

"We were very popular in the late 1960s", Coley said. "We even opened for Led Zeppelin and Three Dog Night, and remember, we were just high school kids".

Discography

Album

Singles

References

Psychedelic rock music groups from Texas
Musical groups from Dallas